Arthur William Lochhead (8 December 1897 – 30 December 1966) was a Scottish footballer who played as a centre forward.

Having served in the Royal Garrison Artillery during World War I, Lochhead started his career with Heart of Midlothian, making his debut aged 21 in March 1919 and soon came into consideration for the Scottish national team, taking part in the 1920 Home Scots v Anglo-Scots trial match before transferring to Manchester United in a swap deal in 1921, with Hearts exchanging him for £530 and Tom Miller.

After scoring 50 goals in 153 appearances for United, he transferred to Leicester City in 1925 for a club record fee, where he found the net over 100 times, played in another Scotland trial (the last of its kind) in 1928, and was part of the side who finished Football League First Division runners-up in 1928–29. He later managed the Foxes for two years.

Notes

References

1897 births
1966 deaths
Scottish footballers
Association football forwards
People from Busby, East Renfrewshire
Sportspeople from East Renfrewshire
Royal Garrison Artillery soldiers
British Army personnel of World War I
Heart of Midlothian F.C. players
Manchester United F.C. players
Leicester City F.C. players
Scottish Football League players
English Football League players
Scottish football managers
Leicester City F.C. managers
Military personnel from East Renfrewshire